The Harlow PJC-2 was a 1930s American four-seat cabin monoplane, designed by Max Harlow.

Development
Max Harlow was an aeronautical engineer and instructor at the Pasadena Junior College.  Under his tutelage, the aircraft designated PJC-1 was designed and built as a class project. The PJC-1 first flew on 14 September 1937 at Alhambra, California but it crashed during an extended (more than six turn) spin test with the center of gravity ballasted to the aft limit, as it was going through the certification process—a problem generally laid at the feet the unusually rigorous spin test requirement and the government test pilot, who bailed out of the airplane after the spin "flattened out."  The airplane struck the ground, still in the "flat" (longitudinally level) attitude in a bean field near Mines Field (now Los Angeles International Airport) with considerable  damage; although repairable, the PJC-1 was never returned to service.  PJC students then built a slightly modified airplane, which limited aileron travel with full aft-stick and incorporated a slightly larger vertical stabilizer. This became the PJC-2 model, serial number 1 certified by the FAA on 20 May 1938.  It was one of the first, if not the first, airplane designed and built in the U.S. with a stressed-skin semi-monocoque structure—a revolutionary design feature for the time. Harlow saw the potential and formed the Harlow Aircraft Company to build PJC-2 aircraft at Alhambra Airport. Four aircraft were impressed into United States Army Air Forces service with the designation UC-80 in 1942, and used by Civil Aeronautics Administration inspectors after WWII.

Design

The PJC-2 was an all-metal low-wing cantilever monoplane with conventional low-set tailplane and a retractable tailwheel landing gear. A tandem two-seat version intended as a military trainer was developed as the Harlow PC-5.

Operational history
In 1991, 3 PJC-2s were actively flying.

Variants
PJC-1
Prototype, one built.
PJC-2
One prototype, serial number 1, a Warner Super Scarab radial engine, followed by 10 production airplanes.  Most remaining examples have been re-engined with a Warner 165 HP or 185 HP engine.

Specifications Harlow PJC-2

See also

References

 The Illustrated Encyclopedia of Aircraft (Part Work 1982-1985), 1985, Orbis Publishing, Page 2099

1930s United States civil utility aircraft
Low-wing aircraft
Single-engined tractor aircraft
PJC-02
Aircraft first flown in 1937